Howard Omar Wilcox (February 20, 1905 – October 13, 1946) was an American racecar driver active during the 1930s. He was of no relation to fellow Indy driver and 1919 Indianapolis 500 winner Howdy Wilcox. He assumed the name "Howdy Wilcox II" to differentiate himself from the former.

Biography 
He was born on February 20, 1905, in Indianapolis, Indiana.

After finishing second at the 1932 Indianapolis 500 in his rookie year, he was disqualified before the start of the race after qualifying in 1933 Indianapolis 500 because race officials learned of medical problems Wilcox was having due to diabetes. Other drivers in the race attempted to get Wilcox reinstated, but his car ended up being driven by future three-time winner Mauri Rose. Following the race Wilcox sued the speedway for slander, claiming reports had labeled him epileptic rather than diabetic. The $50,000 suit was settled for $3000.

He died on October 13, 1946, in Converse, Indiana. He had stepped onto the track to wave the checkered flag for Jimmy Wilburn and was hit by the car of Kenneth Wines who was following close behind.

Indianapolis 500 results

References

Indianapolis 500 drivers
1905 births
1946 deaths
Racing drivers from Indianapolis
Racing drivers who died while racing
Sports deaths in Indiana